Artenacia is a genus of moths of the family Yponomeutidae.

Species
Artenacia jaurella - Chrétien, 1905 

Yponomeutidae